Wu Shezhou (born 1958) is a general of the Chinese People's Liberation Army Ground Force. He has been Political Commissar of the Western Theater Command since January 2017.

Biography
Wu Shezhou was born in Hanchuan, Hubei Province in 1958, and served in the Guangzhou Military Region for most of his career.

He served as Deputy Director of the Political Department of the Guangzhou MR until late 2012, when we was appointed Political Commissar of the Joint Logistics Department of the Guangzhou MR. In late 2014, he was transferred to the Jinan Military Region to serve as its Director of the Political Department, succeeding Jiang Yong. During Central Military Commission chairman Xi Jinping's military reform, in early 2016 Wu was appointed Political Commissar of the Ground Force of the newly established Central Theater Command, and concurrently as Deputy Political Commissar of the Central TC. In July he was awarded the rank of lieutenant general.

In January 2017 Wu was promoted to Political Commissar of the strategic Western Theater Command, replacing General Zhu Fuxi. It was an unusual move because at the age of 61, Zhu had not reached the retirement age of 65 for an officer of his rank. At the time of his appointment Wu was the youngest of the ten top officers of China's five theater commands.

On August 20, 2021, he was appointed vice chairperson of the National People's Congress Ethnic Affairs Committee.

In October 2017, he was elected as a member of the 19th Central Committee of the Chinese Communist Party.

References

1958 births
Living people
People from Xiaogan
People's Liberation Army generals from Hubei
Members of the 19th Central Committee of the Chinese Communist Party